Some Buddhist terms and concepts lack direct translations into English that cover the breadth of the original term. Below are given a number of important Buddhist terms, short definitions, and the languages in which they appear. In this list, an attempt has been made to organize terms by their original form and give translations and synonyms in other languages along with the definition.

Languages and traditions dealt with here:
 English (Eng.)
 Pāli: Theravada Buddhism
 Sanskrit (or Buddhist Hybrid Sanskrit): primarily Mahayana Buddhism
 Bengali (Bgd): Buddhism in Bangladesh
 Burmese (Bur): Buddhism in Myanmar
 Karen (Kar): Theravada Buddhism
 Khmer: Buddhism in Cambodia
 Mon (Mon): Theravada Buddhism
 Mongolian (Mn): Buddhism in Mongolia
 Shan (Shan): Theravada Buddhism
 Tibetan (Tib): Tibetan Buddhism
 Dzongkha ༼རྫོང་ཁ༽ (Dzo): Buddhism in Bhutan
 Thai: Buddhism in Thailand
 Lao: Buddhism in Laos
 CJKV languages
 Chinese (Cn): Chinese Buddhism
 Japanese (Jp): Buddhism in Japan
 Korean (Ko): Korean Buddhism
 Vietnamese (Vi): Buddhism in Vietnam (Mahayana and Theravada)
 Javanese (Jv): Buddhism in Indonesia

A

B

C

D

F

G

H

I

J

K

L

M

N

O

P

R

S

T

U

V

Y

Z

See also
 Buddhism
 Buddhist texts
 Glossary of Japanese Buddhism
 Diamond Realm

References

External links
 Pali Text Society Dictionary (Be sure to check the "Unicode font" option, and to have one; also, if looking for a word, choose "words that match")
 Monier-Williams Sanskrit-English Dictionary
 Digital Dictionary of Buddhism (Login with userid "guest")
 Kadampa Glossary of Buddhist Terms
Fo Guang Shan Glossary of Buddhist Terms (with Chinese translation)

Buddhism-related lists
 
 
Wikipedia glossaries using tables